The  is an underground rapid transit line in Osaka, Japan, operated by Osaka Metro. The line connects Umeda, Hommachi, Yotsubashi, Namba, Daikokuchō and Suminoe, and runs parallel to the Midōsuji Line from Daikokuchō to Nishi-Umeda. Station numbers are indicated by the letter Y.

Overview 
The Yotsubashi Line runs in a north and south direction. connecting the Osaka Metro Nankō Port Town Line at Suminoekōen Station. At first, it was a branch of the Osaka Metro Midōsuji Line, branching off at Daikokuchō Station but was extended north to Nishi-Umeda Station and made a separate line.

History
10 May 1942 – Daikokuchō – Hanazonochō (opening)
Construction stopped during World War II.
1 June 1956 – Hanazonochō – Kishinosato (opening)
31 May 1958 – Kishinosato – Tamade (opening)
1 October 1965 – Daikokuchō – Nishi-Umeda (opening)
9 November 1972 – Tamade – Suminoekōen (opening)

Future plans
A northward extension to Jūsō Station is under review.

Operations 
Most trains are operated between Nishi-Umeda station and Suminoe-Koen Station, with 2–3 minute interval during the morning rush hour, 6–7½ minute interval during the day, 3–4 minute intervals at the afternoon, 5–10 minute interval at night, and 10 minute interval in the early morning and late night. During the morning and evening (afternoon on weekends only), there are train that only run between Kita-Kagaya station and Nishi Umeda Station, as Kita-Kagaya is connected to the Yotsubashi Line depot at Midorigi. 

In addition, on the day of the Suminoe boat race at night (excluding Sundays), one special train operates between 9pm and 10pm. 

It is connected with the New-Tram at Suminoe-Koen station.

On 23 March 2013, the Osaka Bureau of Transport revised the timetable for the Yotsubashi Line. By using the train that was a going to a depot without any passengers, the final train became 0:20am for the northbound and 0:10am (for Suminoe-Koen) and 0:36am (for Kita-Kagaya) for the southbound. And because of passenger demand, for weekdays between 10am and 12pm was changed from 5 minute to 6 minute interval and for weekends and on holidays between 10am and 3pm was changed from 5-6 minute interval to 7-7½ minute interval.

Since 2016, the regular inspection of the trains used on the third rail lines of Osaka Metro has been carried at Midorigi depot, trains of the Midosuji Line, the Tanimachi Line, the Chuo Line, and the Sennichimae Line may run on the Yotsubashi Line.

Stations

Rolling stock

Current
 23 series (since 1990)

All trains are based at Midorigi Depot. Since 2014, Yotsubashi Line trains are also able to access Morinomiya Depot located on the Chuo Line, after a connecting track was built between these two lines near Hommachi Station. Currently all trains are 6 cars long but subway platforms are long enough to accommodate trains up to 8 cars long.

Former
 400 series (1942–1969)
 1000 series (1956–1971)
 1100 series (1958–1979)
 1200 series (1958–1980)
 50 series (1960–1980)
 30 series (1972–1996)

See also
 List of railway electrification systems in Japan

References

Osaka Metro
Rail transport in Osaka Prefecture
Railway lines opened in 1942
Standard gauge railways in Japan
1942 establishments in Japan
750 V DC railway electrification